Psoroptoididae is a family of mites belonging to the order Sarcoptiformes.

Genera:
 Allopsoroptoides Mironov, 2013
 Anomothrix Gaud, 1973
 Dicamaralges Gaud & Atyeo, 1967
 Eurydiscalges Faccini, Gaud & Atyeo, 1976
 Hexacaudalges Mironov & Proctor, 2005
 Hyomesalges Gaud & Atyeo, 1967
 Mesalges Trouessart, 1888
 Mesalgoides Gaud & Atyeo, 1967
 Pandalura Hull, 1934
 Psoroptoides Trouessart, 1919
 Temnalges Gaud & Atyeo, 1967

References 

Acari